Viesville is a village of Wallonia and a district of the municipality of Pont-à-Celles, located in the province of Hainaut, Belgium.

The village is crossed by the Charleroi-Brussels Canal.

The European highway E42 crosses the Charleroi-Brussels Canal via a viaduct in Viesville.

References

External links 
 Tourist information 

Former municipalities of Hainaut (province)